Cover Story is an American documentary television program broadcast by Game Show Network (GSN). The program premiered on January 14, 2018, airing episodes Sunday evenings for three weeks before disappearing from GSN's schedule. In March, the network announced that the series would return following what was considered a "successful debut." It returned on June 10, 2018.

Episodes

References

Notes

External links
 

2010s American reality television series
2018 American television series debuts
English-language television shows
Game Show Network original programming
2018 American television series endings